Art Dorrington (March 13, 1930 – December 29, 2017) was a Canadian professional ice hockey centre.

Dorrington became the first black hockey player to sign a National Hockey League (NHL) contract when he joined the New York Rangers organization in 1950. Despite putting up very good statistics in the minor leagues, he was never able to make it to the major league ranks.  Dorrington played for the Atlantic City Seagulls of the Eastern Hockey League.

After retiring from hockey, Dorrington joined the Atlantic County Sheriff's Office. In the late 1990s he created the Art Dorrington Ice Hockey Foundation, a program that teaches hockey to children from low-income families in Atlantic City.

He died on December 29, 2017, at the age of 87 in Atlantic City.

References

External links

1930 births
2017 deaths
Black Canadian ice hockey players
Black Nova Scotians
Boston Olympics players
Canadian emigrants to the United States
Canadian ice hockey centres
Eastern Hockey League players
Ice hockey people from Nova Scotia
Johnstown Jets players
Johnstown Jets (IHL) players
People from Truro, Nova Scotia
Washington Lions players